Diacamma is a genus of queenless ants belonging to the subfamily Ponerinae. It is distributed from India to Australia and contains about 24 species.

Biology
A queen caste does not exist in Diacamma. Unique to this genus, all workers emerge from cocoons with a pair of tiny innervated thoracic appendages (gemmae) that are homologous with wings. Mutilation leads to a permanent change in lifetime trajectory, because workers lacking gemmae never mate. This is unlike other queenless ants where workers establish a dominance hierarchy to regulate reproduction. In Diacamma only one worker retains her gemmae in each colony, she is the gamergate (mated egglaying worker), and she bites off the gemmae of newly emerged workers. Mutilation causes the degeneration of the neuronal connections between the sensory hairs on the gemma's surface and the central nervous system, and this may explain the irreversibility of modifications in individual behaviour.

Species

Diacamma assamense Emery, 1897
Diacamma australe (Fabricius, 1775)
Diacamma baguiense Wheeler & Chapman, 1925
Diacamma bispinosum (Le Guillou, 1842)
Diacamma ceylonense Emery, 1897
Diacamma colosseense Forel, 1915
Diacamma cupreum (Smith, 1860)
Diacamma cyaneiventre André, 1887
Diacamma holosericeum (Roger, 1860)
Diacamma indicum Santschi, 1920
Diacamma intricatum (Smith, 1857)
Diacamma jacobsoni Forel, 1912
Diacamma leve Crawley, 1915
Diacamma longitudinale Emery, 1889
Diacamma palawanicum Emery, 1900
Diacamma pallidum (Smith, 1858)
Diacamma panayense Wheeler & Chapman, 1925
Diacamma purpureum (Smith, 1863)
Diacamma rugivertex Emery, 1902
Diacamma rugosum (Le Guillou, 1842)
Diacamma scalpratum (Smith, 1858)
Diacamma schoedli Shattuck & Barnett, 2006
Diacamma sericeiventre Stitz, 1925

References

External links

 Diacamma photo gallery by Alexander Wild

Ponerinae
Ant genera
Hymenoptera of Asia
Hymenoptera of Australia
Taxa named by Gustav Mayr